Justice Addition is an unincorporated community and census-designated place (CDP) in Logan County, West Virginia, United States. The community was first listed as a CDP prior to the 2020 census. The population was 331 at the 2020 census.

Geography
The CDP sits on the west bank of the Guyandotte River, a north-flowing tributary of the Ohio River. The community of Henlawson borders Justice Addition to the northeast, across the Guyandotte.

References 

Census-designated places in West Virginia
Census-designated places in Logan County, West Virginia
Unincorporated communities in West Virginia
Unincorporated communities in Logan County, West Virginia
Populated places on the Guyandotte River